Solza is a rural locality (a settlement) in Ukhotskoye Rural Settlement of Kargopolsky District, Arkhangelsk Oblast, Russia. The population was 65 as of 2010. There are 6 streets.

Geography 
Solza is located 92 km south of Kargopol (the district's administrative centre) by road. Krechetovo is the nearest rural locality.

References 

Rural localities in Kargopolsky District